Shireh Jin (also Romanized as Shīreh Jīn; also known as Shīrvānchīq, Shirvanjik, and Shirvan Jikh) is a village in Razliq Rural District, in the Central District of Sarab County, East Azerbaijan Province, Iran. At the 2006 census, its population was 1,304, in 340 families.

References 

Populated places in Sarab County